Toshio Honma (March 3, 1877 - February 2, 1970) was a Japanese Home Ministry and Police Bureau government official and businessman. He was born in Yamagata Prefecture. He was a graduate of the University of Tokyo. He was governor of Nagano Prefecture (1922-1924) and Yamanashi Prefecture (1924-1925).

References

1877 births
1970 deaths
Japanese Home Ministry government officials
Japanese Police Bureau government officials
Japanese businesspeople
University of Tokyo alumni
People from Yamagata Prefecture
Governors of Nagano
Governors of Yamanashi Prefecture